The Fool is the debut studio album by American singer and songwriter Ryn Weaver. It was released on June 16, 2015 by Mad Love and Interscope Records. The debut single, "OctaHate", was released on August 8, 2014. The album was made available to stream for free at the iTunes Store on June 9, 2015.

Background and promotion
The Fool features production by Benny Blanco and Michael Angelakos, whom Weaver also worked with in the writing of the album. She also worked with British singer-songwriter Charlotte Aitchison, better known by her moniker Charli XCX on the album's first single, "OctaHate". Other contributors include Norwegian producer and musician Cashmere Cat, English musician Charlotte OC and OneRepublic frontman, Ryan Tedder.

Lyrically, The Fool explores topics of romantic relationships, family relationships, self-discovery and self-doubt. On the overlying theme of the album, Weaver stated the following:
The record poses the question: Is it foolish to settle for what you always thought you wanted as a 22-year-old woman, or is it foolish to go and leave what’s so beautiful, stable, and certain? I think that’s a question a lot of young women have these days, especially coming from a generation of girls who — in my opinion— have less of a road map. It’s not just about being a woman: It’s about being a modern human and about fear of commitment.

Weaver performed her song "Promises" from the album on the Tonight Show with Jimmy Fallon on June 19, 2015.

Singles
"OctaHate" was released as the debut single on June 21, 2014, and impacted Top 40 radio on February 24, 2015. The song peaked at number 27 on the Billboard Pop Songs chart. The original music video for "OctaHate" was taken down, and replaced by a new one on May 14, 2015. During an interview with NY Mag, Weaver talked about why she took down the original. She claims the video wasn't executed properly and chose to create a new one because she "wanted people to understand [her] cohesive vision." The new music video for "OctaHate" was inspired by the 1966 film Daisies by director Věra Chytilová. Weaver explained, "For the second one, we ripped a page from this '60s Czech film called Daisies — this feminist, absurdist piece. In this scene, they talk about how the whole world is spoiled and how as a result, they should spoil themselves," — a theme which can be seen mirrored in the music video.

"Promises" was released on August 25, 2016, to Top 40 radio as the second single from the album.

Promotional Singles
Although not announced as an official single, "The Fool" was made available on iTunes on April 10, 2015, shortly after the album was made available for pre-order. The song was premiered the previous day on BBC Radio 1. A music video for the song was released on May 7, 2015. Weaver stated that the music video was inspired by Studio Ghibli, the animation film studio which features many works by Japanese director Hayao Miyazaki. Also speaking on the video, she explained, "I wanted to touch on the shifting power dynamic within relationships in a surrealist, psychedelic medium... I've come to realize that my own empowerment has the tendency to result in emasculation and a new dependency that only heightens my fear of commitment."

Critical reception

Upon its release, The Fool received generally positive to mixed reviews from critics. At Metacritic, which assigns a normalized rating out of 100 to reviews from mainstream critics, The Fool received an average score of 65, based on 13 reviews. Writing for Consequence of Sound, Lyndsey Havens stated that the album "spins on like a series of diary entries", while comparing Weaver's vocals to those of Florence Welch and Imogen Heap. In a mixed review, Pitchforks Miles Raymer claimed that the album had nothing close to "matching the intense pop rush" of her debut single "OctaHate".

On a positive note, Jon Parales of the New York Times highlighted the album's experimental tone, saying that Weaver channeled Stevie Nicks while also noting the track "Travelling Song" as the best track of the album, stating "It’s ardent, musically confident and openly careerist."

Commercial performance
The Fool sold 13,800 units in its first week. It debuted and peaked at number 30 on the Billboard 200.

Track listing

Personnel
Credits adapted from the liner notes of The Fool.

Aryn Wüthrich – vocals 
Michael Angelakos – instrumentation, production, programming ; executive production
Mike Bader – assistant engineer 
Benny Blanco – instrumentation, production, programming ; executive production
Nick Brown – drums 
Cashmere Cat – instrumentation, production, programming 
Jennifer Decilveo – additional production 
Matty Green – assistant engineer to mixer
Seif "Mageef" Hussain – production coordination
Andrew "McMuffin" Luftman – A&R, production coordination
Phil Peterson – strings 
Chris Sclafani – additional production ; bass ; mandolin ; engineering
Mark "Spike" Stent – mixing
Geoff Swan – assistant engineer to mixer
Eryck Bry – mixing

Charts

Release history

References 

2015 debut albums
Interscope Records albums
Albums produced by Benny Blanco
Albums produced by Cashmere Cat